The 1921–22 Mercer Baptists men's basketball team represented Mercer University in the 1921–22 NCAA men's basketball season. The team claimed an SIAA championship, and was runner-up to North Carolina in the 1922 Southern Conference men's basketball tournament. Mercer pulled the upset of the tournament when they beat defending champion Kentucky 35 to 22.

The Baptists were led by coach Josh Cody and featured players receiving All-Southern votes at each position: running guard George Harmon, forward Consuello Smith, and center Bob Gamble. At the other forward was Bubber Pope, and the other, standing guard was captain Smokey Harper. Harper was a veteran of World War I.

Bob Gamble hit a half-court buzzer beater to beat Georgia Tech.

Schedule

|+Schedule
|-
!colspan=9 style=| Regular season

|-
!colspan=9 style=| Southern Conference tournament

References

Mercer Bears men's basketball seasons
Mercer